Up in Flames is the second studio album by Canadian musician Dan Snaith, released under the moniker Manitoba on March 31, 2003 by The Leaf Label and Domino Recording Company. It is Snaith's second and final album credited under Manitoba, and received critical acclaim when it was released.

In 2006, a special edition of Up in Flames was released. In 2013, the album was reissued under Snaith's current moniker, Caribou, and in 2015, it was selected by fans as one of ten albums re-issued by The Leaf Label as part of the label's 20th anniversary celebrations. This saw the album released on limited edition double vinyl and made available to fans via the PledgeMusic service.

News program Democracy Now! uses "Kid You'll Move Mountains" as part of their regular theme music.

Reception

Up in Flames received acclaim from critics and has been assigned a score of 88 based on 20 critic reviews, translating to "universal acclaim", from Metacritic. Online magazine Pitchfork placed Up in Flames at number 106 on its list of top 200 albums of the 2000s.

Track listing

Charts

References

External links
 Up in Flames at official Caribou website
 

2003 albums
Dan Snaith albums
Domino Recording Company albums
The Leaf Label albums